The Fort Wayne Philharmonic Orchestra is an American orchestra based in Fort Wayne, Indiana. The orchestra's primary concert venues are the Embassy Theatre and the Auer Performance Hall at Purdue University Fort Wayne. The orchestra's current music director is Andrew Constantine.

History
The Fort Wayne Philharmonic Orchestra was founded in 1944, and gave its first concert on October 18, 1944, at the Palace Theatre. The first music director was the German-born Hans Schwieger (1907-2000). Under Schwieger's direction, the orchestra featured such soloists as William Kapell, Yehudi Menuhin, and Mario Lanza.

In the summer of 1948, Igor Buketoff became the orchestra's second music director, and served in the post until 1966, the longest serving music director to date.  Successive music directors have been James Sample (1967-1970) and Thomas Briccetti (1970-1977).  From 1978 to 1993, the orchestra's music director was Ronald Ondrejka (1932-2016). During Ondrejka's tenure, the orchestra's budget tripled in size, and new programming initiatives included regular collaboration with the Fort Wayne Ballet.

Edvard Tchivzhel succeeded Ondrejka as music director in 1993, and served in the post until the end of the 2007–2008 season.  Jaime Laredo served as artistic advisor for the 2008–2009 season, in the absence of a full-time music director.  The English conductor Andrew Constantine was named the orchestra's next music director in July 2009. His current contract with the orchestra is through 2020.  

Since 1980, the orchestra has won five awards for adventuresome programming from ASCAP (American Society of Composers, Authors and Publishers). The Fort Wayne Philharmonic Chorus is affiliated with the orchestra, and its current director is Benjamin Rivera.

In addition, a chamber orchestra from the full Philharmonic has performed summer concerts. Members of the orchestra have also participated in the "Summer Symphony", founded by Joseph M. Woods in 1956, who played with the Philharmonic from 1948 to 1950. Concerts have taken place at the Foellinger Theatre in Franke Park, led by former principal trombonist David Cooke.

A labor dispute between the musicians and management in early December 2022 has resulted in the cancellation of concerts in December 2022, as well as January and February 2023.

Broadcasts and recordings
In 1999, Tchivzhel and the orchestra recorded a commercial CD at the Honeywell Center in Wabash, which includes Tchaikovsky's Symphony No. 6 and Richard Strauss' symphonic poem Don Juan.

The Philharmonic made a new commercial recording during a concert in the Auer Performance Hall at Purdue-Fort Wayne on March 18, 2018, devoted to three works by the Austrian-American composer Walter Bricht (1904-1970).

Performances have often been rebroadcast on a delay by local National Public Radio affiliates, typically WBNI 89.1-2.

Music directors
 Hans Schwieger (1944–1948)
 Igor Buketoff (1948–1966)
 James Sample (1967–1970)
 Thomas Briccetti (1970–1977)
 Ronald Ondrejka (1978–1993)
 Edvard Tchivzhel (1993–2008)
 Andrew Constantine (2010–present)

Executive directors (partial list)
 Peter Smith (1976–1985)
 Christopher D. Guerin (1985–2005)
 Daniel Ross (interim, 2005–2006)
 J.L. Nave (2006–2014)
 James Palermo (2015–2022)
 Brittany Hall (2022–present)

References

External links
 Official website of the Fort Wayne Philharmonic
 Official website of the Fort Wayne Philharmonic Players Association
 Official web page of the Fort Wayne Philharmonic Chorus

Note on sources
Eyewitness accounts by Robert E. Nylund form part of the reference material for this article.

American orchestras
Culture of Fort Wayne, Indiana
Tourist attractions in Fort Wayne, Indiana
Musical groups established in 1944
Musical groups from Indiana
Performing arts in Indiana